Lennard Pearce (9 February 1915 – 15 December 1984) was an English actor who worked in theatre and television. He was perhaps best known as Grandad in the BBC television series Only Fools and Horses, in which he starred from 1981 until his death in December 1984.

Early life
Pearce was born on February 9, 1915, in Paddington. He trained as an actor at the Royal Academy of Dramatic Art in London.

Career

Theatre
As a young actor in the 1930s, Pearce joined a performance tour in Germany. According to Nicholas Lyndhurst, one theatrical performance was attended by senior members of the Nazi Party. At the end of the show, party officials came backstage to congratulate the cast, and Pearce shook hands with Adolf Hitler. Lyndhurst claimed that Pearce said that he regretted not taking the opportunity to kill Hitler.

During World War II, Pearce performed for the Entertainments National Service Association. In the early 1960s, he understudied for Stanley Holloway as Alfred P. Doolittle in the original West End production of My Fair Lady. After 1965, he appeared in many plays at the National Theatre, including Much Ado About Nothing and Rosencrantz and Guildenstern Are Dead. He worked with both Laurence Olivier and Anthony Hopkins on stage. In 1966, Pearce starred in Richard Brinsley Sheridan's The Rivals alongside David Jason, but Pearce and Jason did not meet again until 15 years later.

In 1975, Pearce played Owl in a theatre adaptation of Winnie the Pooh at the Phoenix Theatre in London, and two years later, Mr. Witherspoon in Arsenic and Old Lace at the Westminster Theatre. He was also a member of the Royal Shakespeare Company.

Television
Pearce's television work includes Dixon of Dock Green (1965), Dr. Finlay's Casebook (1967), Sykes (1972) and Coronation Street in May 1969 and April 1977, along with The Wednesday Play ("Cathy Come Home", 1966). Pearce also appeared in a Crown Court broadcast in February 1984.

In 1981, Pearce began his role as Grandad in the first three series of the BBC sitcom Only Fools and Horses. He appeared in a 1984 episode of Minder named "The Balance of Power" and played Mr. Coles in three episodes of Shroud for a Nightingale in March 1984. Pearce's last television appearance was on Children in Need, broadcast on BBC1 on 23 November 1984.

Health problems and death
In 1980, while Pearce was a cast member of a play running at the Bristol Old Vic, he began to lose his balance and would frequently fall asleep. He was diagnosed with critical hypertension and was prescribed medication. A heavy smoker for many years, Pearce was in poor health while filming the first episode of Series 4 of Only Fools and Horses. On 12 December 1984, he suffered a heart attack and was rushed to the Whittington Hospital, where his condition improved. Two days later, Only Fools and Horses scriptwriter John Sullivan visited Pearce and assured him that his place in the programme would be left open for him when he recovered. However, following his discharge, Pearce suffered a second heart attack on 15 December at his flat in Archway and died instantly at the age of 69.

Sullivan heard the news the following morning and informed Pearce's Only Fools and Horses costars David Jason and Nicholas Lyndhurst, who were devastated by Pearce's sudden death, as were the entire crew.

When Pearce died, production had begun for the Only Fools and Horses episode "Hole in One." The episode was rewritten around Grandad's death, and scenes that had been filmed on location with Pearce were reshot with Buster Merryfield as the replacement character Uncle Albert. The episode "Strained Relations" begins in the wake of the death of the Grandad character.

Filmography

Film

Television

References

External links

1915 births
1984 deaths
English male stage actors
English male television actors
20th-century English male actors
British male comedy actors
People from Paddington